Marguerite Gosse Clark (March 13, 1890 – 1972) was an American politician. She was the first woman native to the state to serve in the Nevada Legislature.

Biography
Marguerite H. Gosse was born in Virginia City, Nevada in 1890. Her father, Harry Gosse, was the owner of the Riverside Hotel in Reno, Nevada, a member of the Improved Order of Red Men, and a past Past Grand Sachem of the State of Nevada. Her mother was Josephine. She had a brother, Henry.

She was a Republican member of the Nevada Assembly (1922–24), representing Washoe County. Gosse was the first woman native to the state to serve in the Nevada Legislature. In 1922, she became the founder of the Nevada Womans' Party. The following year, she introduced the Nurse Practice Act of Nevada; this legislation provided for Registered Nurses in the state.

Gosse married Jack Clark (1883-1969), who owned gaming and bar interests in Reno.

References

Sources
 

1890 births
1972 deaths
20th-century American politicians
20th-century American women politicians
People from Virginia City, Nevada
Members of the Nevada Assembly
Women state legislators in Nevada